The Twenty-Sixth Legislature of the Territory of Hawaii was a session of the Hawaii Territorial Legislature.  The session convened in Honolulu, Hawaii, and ran from February 21 until May 19, 1951.

Legislative session
The session ran from February 21 until May 19, 1951. It passed 326 bills into law.

Senators

House of Representatives

References

Hawaii legislative sessions